Alice Harris may refer to:

 Alice Harris (linguist) (born 1947), American linguist
 Alice Seeley Harris (1870–1970), English documentary photographer
 Sweet Alice Harris, community organizer